Samuel Bryce Lerner (born September 27, 1992) is an American actor, who is most known for his role as Geoff Schwartz on The Goldbergs, Chowder in Monster House, and as Quinn Goldberg in Project Almanac.

Career 
Lerner appeared in the feature film Envy, as the son of Ben Stiller and Rachel Weisz's characters, and played the son of Wendie Malick and Sam Robards's characters in the pilot by ABC, My Life With Men, and the son of John Leguizamo and Claire Forlani's characters in an untitled Brett Ratner directed pilot for CBS.

Lerner voiced one of the leads, Chowder, in the computer-animated film Monster House (2006). He was nominated for the 2006 Annie Award for Best Voice Acting in an Animated Feature for his role, but lost the award by Sir Ian McKellen for Flushed Away.

He has appeared on the television shows Malcolm in the Middle, The King of Queens, Two and a Half Men, Oliver Beene, and Sonny With a Chance, and had a recurring voice role on the Cartoon Network show Whatever Happened to Robot Jones?. He did the voice for Zak Saturday on Cartoon Network's, The Secret Saturdays.

On October 16, 2017, Lerner was cast as Ronnie in the Blumhouse supernatural thriller film Truth or Dare. The film was released in theaters on April 13, 2018.

Personal life 
Lerner was born in Los Angeles, the son of Patti (née Klein), a reporter, and Ken Lerner, an actor (who also played his onscreen father in The Goldbergs). His uncle is actor Michael Lerner, and their family is Jewish.

Filmography

Television

References 

1992 births
21st-century American Jews
21st-century American male actors
American male child actors
American male film actors
American male television actors
American male voice actors
American people of Romanian-Jewish descent
Jewish American male actors
Living people
Male actors from Los Angeles